Miriam Redito Quiambao-Roberto (born May 20, 1975) is a Filipino physical therapist, inspirational speaker, author, entrepreneur, actress, television host, real estate broker, endorser, model, and beauty pageant titleholder who was crowned Binibining Pilipinas Universe 1999 and placed first Runner-Up at Miss Universe 1999.

She is currently serving as one of the co-hosts of The 700 Club Asia.

Early life
Miriam Redito Quiambao was born on May 20, 1975, in Quezon City to Medardo Quiambao of Bacacay, Albay, and Magdalena (née Redito) of Oas, Albay, and is the first of two children. She attended the School of the Holy Spirit of Quezon City during her elementary and high school years and went for her collegiate studies at the University of Santo Tomas, where she obtained her degree in physical therapy. She is also a licensed Physical Therapist for the state of Indiana in the United States. Before her Binibining Pilipinas stint, Quiambao had a thriving career as a therapist for St. Luke's Hospital in Manila. Also, she worked as an instructor for a local gym.

Pageantry

Binibining Pilipinas
In 1999, Quiambao joined the Binibining Pilipinas pageant. She received several awards, including Miss Photogenic, and captured the Binibining Pilipinas World 1999 title. However, controversy soon erupted when the Binibining Pilipinas Universe titleholder Janelle Bautista was dethroned due to questionable citizenship.  She was then asked to take over the title and be the Philippine representative to the Miss Universe 1999 pageant to be held that year in Trinidad and Tobago. Binibining Pilipinas International 1999, Lalaine Edson took over Quiambao's previous title.

Miss Universe 1999
Before arriving at the host country, Quiambao trained in Venezuela under the guidance of Osmel Sousa for a week.

She was one of the strongest and most visible contenders for the crown. She consistently placed second during the pageant's preliminaries and bested a composite score of 9.52, just trailing behind the score of Sonia Raciti, the South African candidate. At the semi-finals, she once again placed second overall in the swimsuit and evening gown competitions, racking up scores as high as 9.32 and 9.42 respectively. It was Spain's candidate, Diana Nogueira that dominated the semi-finals with a marginal lead over Quiambao of 9.33 for the swimsuit event and 9.45 for the evening gown competition.

The fall
During the preliminary round of the evening gown competition, Quiambao slipped and fell on stage. As she walked, the heel of one of her shoes got caught in the trail of her evening gown and she slipped on the floor. Despite this incident she collected herself, regained composure, walked graciously, finished her walk, and drew applause from the audience. At the finals, Quiambao referred to the incident during an interview portion. She said "she felt she represented those women who have fallen both on and off the stage" and hopes to be "an example to the rest of the women in the world".

Final results
Early at the competition she received the Clairol Herbal Essences Style Award, the only Asian candidate at the pageant to do so. She was called as one of the final three delegates, alongside Misses Botswana and Spain. Quiambao faltered during the final question, which tackled the debate of whether a Miss Universe should continue her reign even if she gets pregnant. Spain's Diana Nogueira placed as second Runner-up. It all came down to Philippines' Quiambao and Botswana's Mpule Kwelagobe, and in the end, Quiambao placed as first Runner-up, with Mpule Kwelagobe of Botswana winning the Miss Universe 1999 title.

Television and show business career
After her triumphant stint at the pageant, Quiambao began a new career working as a TV Host/Correspondent for GMA Network back in the Philippines. In December 1999, she co-hosted Unang Hirit" with Arnold Clavio, Lyn Ching-Pascual, Suzi Entrata-Abrera, Mickey Ferriols and Ryan Agoncillo. Quiambao hosted a lifestyle segment of the show called "Istayl".

In 2002, Quiambao has a commercial of Mister Donut Twist she reprises her iconic fall in Miss Universe.

Quiambao then joined Paolo Bediones on hosting the show Extra, Extra, which eventually evolved into a reality program called Extra Challenge. Upon leaving the show in December 2003, a nationwide search was made for her replacement. She briefly hosted All About You, a show about women and good values, and fulfilled her dream of having her own talk show.

In January 2004, she married Italian businessman Claudio Rondinelli but the two-year marriage eventually fell apart and Quiambao went back to the Philippines in 2006. She resumed her TV hosting career, working alongside again with Paolo Bediones, this time presenting a travel show, Pinoy Meets World.

She also co-hosted for the show Palaban on GMA 7 with Winnie Monsod and Malou Mangahas tackling current events, socio-economic and political issues in the Philippines in 2007. Also, she became the host for QTV 11's "Dahil Sa Iyong Paglisan", a made for TV show highlighting the experiences, trials and success of Overseas Filipino Workers or OFW.

During the first anniversary of 100% Pinoy, she was one of the new host together with Joaquin Valdez. She was also the co-host for The Beat (formerly Sapulso) on QTV with journalist/newscaster Ivan Mayrina.

In the second half of 2009, she went on to test her acting skills by appearing in a Philippine horror movie Patient X as the Nurse Betty and the comedy movie Kimmy Dora as Gertrude. Once again, she appeared on television through the TV series "Kung Tayo'y Magkakalayo" as Aludra, the guest villain for the series.

In 2011, she played Josie/Alonah in the Fantasy series Bangis on TV5. She played as  "Maxene" in notable sitcom The Jose and Wally Show Starring Vic Sotto on the said network. In that same year, she had a cameo role as Ryan Agoncillo's boss for the movie House Husband: Ikaw Na!.

Controversy
Quiambao was criticized by the LGBT community in the Philippines in early 2012 over remarks she made about homosexuality while being a guest on the current affairs talk show The Bottomline with Boy Abunda. It was followed by her taking her stand to a Twitter post, saying: "Homosexuality is not a sin but it is a lie from the devil." Her words have caused a huge backlash with openly gay Filipino celebrities and the rest of the entertainment industry criticizing her for such a "closed-minded" statement. She has since apologized for "not being sensitive" with her choice of words on a Twitter post.

Other notable credits and appearances

 Celebrity Endorser for the following products: Olay Total Effects, Olay Body Soap, Mister Donut, Cream Silk, Lactacyd, Lip Out Fiber Food Supplement TV advertisements.
 Celebrity endorser for the Worldvision Development Foundation since 2000 to present. Advocate for Education and Children's Rights. Advocate against Child Labor for the year 2006–2007.
 Events emcee for the Gusi Peace Prize Awards in 2010, Star Awards for TV in 2010 and other corporate events
 "Showtime"- guest judge
 "Magpakailanman" on GMA 7; acting role as "Nelia Sancho"
 "Matakot Ka Sa Karma" (2006); a cameo role as a Socialite; directed by Jose Javier Reyes
 "Walang Kapalit" (2003); acting role as "Celine"; directed by Joel Lamangan
 "Broken Hearts Club" (2009); comedy-drama; as "Felice" directed by Joey Reyes
 Various TV program appearances on ABS-CBN2, GMA 7, QTV 11, TV5 shows
 Various hosting stints for corporate events
 Actively participant in fashion shows and modeling gigs
 Frequent cover girl for various magazines, often the subject of editorials as well
Played Alondra in Kung Tayo'y Magkakalayo (2010)

Personal life

Quiambao was previously married to Italian businessman Claudio Rondinelli in 2004 and lived with him in Hong Kong.  Their marriage ended in divorce in 2006.
In 2013, she got engaged to previously widower boyfriend Eduardo "Ardy" Roberto Jr., a Christian author and motivational speaker. The couple got married on March 25, 2014. Quiambao and Roberto have two children together – Elijah, born February 2019, and Ezekiel, born July 2021. Quiambao also has a stepson, Joshua, from Roberto's first marriage. While pregnant with Elijah, she was diagnosed with APS syndrome.

On January 11, 2022, Quiambao announced that she had tested positive for COVID-19 days before and was on quarantine; she completed her quarantine and tested negative on January 21.

As author
Quiambao wrote her first book, He Can Catch You When You Fall, which tells a story of her life full of hope and second chances. It was published in 2015.

Awards

 Most Outstanding Bicolana Award, Ibalong 1999
 Most Outstanding Alumna Award, UST 1999
 Millennium Men and Women Award, Evian 1999
 Clairol Herbal Essences Award, Miss Universe Pageant 1999
 First Runner-up, Miss Universe 1999
 Bb. Pilipinas-Universe 1999

Filmography

Film

Television

References

Notes
 Quiambao was originally Binibining Pilipinas-World, but became Binibining Pilipinas-Universe after the titleholder, Janelle Bautista, was dethroned

External links
 Quiambao's Official Website
 
 Tribute Page
 Article on Her Marriage.
 abs-cbnnews.com, Ex-beauty queen files raps at NBI

1975 births
Bicolano actors
Binibining Pilipinas winners
Filipino film actresses
Filipino Christians
Filipino evangelicals
Filipino people of Chinese descent
Filipino television journalists
Kapampangan people
Living people
Miss Universe 1999 contestants
GMA Network personalities
GMA Integrated News and Public Affairs people
People from Quezon City
University of Santo Tomas alumni
Women television journalists
Filipino television actresses